Yakov Dmitriyevich Tikhai ( pronounced tee-'high) was a Russian orthodox composer, liturgist, and missionary.

With Dmitri Lvovsky, he established a liturgical music school in Tokyo on the grounds of the Japanese mission to educate Japanese Christians in the new forms of music and to teach Japanese choir leaders for the new parishes.

Life
Не graduated from the Chişinău Theological Seminary.

He was recommended by his older brother, archimandrite Anatoly (Tikhai), to then archimandrite Nicholas of Japan, and became Fr. Nicholas' principal arranger of Russian liturgical music to Japanese translations during the early decades of the Japanese mission.

Yakov Tikhai came from the Romanian village of Tărăsăuţi, in the Hotin district in northern Moldova (Bessarabia), and arrived to Japan in early 1874 to assist his brother the Archimandrite Anatoly at his assignment to the parish in Hakodate, Japan. Fr. Anatoly had succeeded Fr. Nicholas in the Hakodate parish when Fr. Nicholas transferred his mission headquarters to Tokyo. Later, Yakov was invited by Fr. Nicholas to serve as choirmaster at Suragadai Kanda.

Under the guidance of Bp. Nicholas, Yakov arranged the music for almost all the needed texts used in the Divine Liturgy, major feasts, baptism, funerals, the first week of Great Lent, and Passion Week. As his successor, Victor Pokrovsky under Metr. Sergius needed to do, Yakov found it necessary to change the music to meet the different sense and structure of the Japanese language. 

Yakov married Yelena Yokoi, daughter of a prominent Japanese family, in 1876.

During a visit to Odessa in 1887, Yakov died. His wife and children later returned to Japan.

External links
 Orthodox Church Singing in Japan   
 Paschal Troparion in three languages (In Church Slavonic, Koine Greek, and Japanese)
  MISIONARI ŞI APOSTOLI ORTODOCŞI ROMÂNI ÎN JAPONIA SECOLULUI XIX

References

Year of birth missing
People from Chernivtsi Oblast
1887 deaths
Members of the Romanian Orthodox Church
Eastern Orthodox missionaries
Romanian Christian missionaries
Romanian expatriates in Japan
Orthodox Church in Japan
Christian missionaries in Japan